Return of the Lucky Stars (Alternative: "Lucky Stars Triad Society") is a 1989 Hong Kong action comedy film directed by Stanley Fung. It is the fifth film out of the Lucky Stars series.

Plot 
Hong Kong Police Supt. Walter Tso arrests Big Dai, the reformed leader of a criminal corporation. When Dai asked his brother Richard Mao to turn himself into the police, he betrays him and decides to take over the corporation. Dai is imprisoned and an informant is murdered by one of Mao's men. With no evidence against Mao and the corporation, Tso coerced four of the "Five Lucky Stars" to go undercover in the prison, rescue Dai, and help nab Mao and bring down the corporation.

Cast
 Richard Ng - Sandy / Tai Shan
 Stanley Fung - Rawhide / Rhino Skin
 Michael Miu - Pagoda / Cone / Ginseng
 Eric Tsang - Roundhead / Lo Han
 Carina Lau - Banana Tso
 Lo Hoi-Pang - Big Dai
 Wong Ching - Richard Mao 
 Joan Tong - Mina
 Cho Tat Wah - Supt. Walter Tso
 Natalis Chan - Sgt Chan
 Kent Cheng - Sgt Cheng
 Wong Jing - Sgt Wong
 Lee Ka-Ting - Ting
 Kenneth Tsang - Uncle Kin
 Fung Ging-Man - Uncle Man
 Benz Hui - Hung
 Yu Kwok-Lok - Boss of Lok Gymnastic   
 Elsie Chan - Wife of Lok Gymnastic's boss
 Sing Fu On - Mao's thug
 Wellson Chin - Mao's thug
 Ridley Tsui - Mao's thug
 Lau Kar-wing - Prisoner
 James Ha - Prisoner
 Frankie Chan - Prisoner
 Ng Kwok-Kin - Cop
 Cynthia Rothrock - Lisa (unconfirmed)

External links
 

Hong Kong action comedy films
Kung fu films
Hong Kong martial arts comedy films
1989 films
1989 martial arts films
1980s Cantonese-language films
1989 action comedy films
1980s Hong Kong films